"Breaking All the Rules" is the debut single by American girl group She Moves. It was released in November 1997 in the United States and quickly reached its peak of number 32 on the Billboard Hot 100 on the week ending December 13 of that year and spent a total of twenty weeks on the chart. It was their only hit in the United States, officially making them a one-hit wonder. In Europe, the single was also successful, peaking at number 11 in Sweden and number 31 in the Netherlands. The music video for the song was directed by Jamie King.

Critical reception
Larry Flick from Billboard wrote that the song "shows them floating light and airy harmonies over a thumping beat and blindingly bright keyboards. In the writing and production of the song, the Berman Brothers have wisely crafted faux-funk and giddy hi-NRG versions to accommodate the fickle, varying needs of pop radio, while the red-hot remix team of Ernie Lake and Bobby Guy toughens the bassline, adding a bit of club credibility. In all, a solid, highly marketable package from an act that you will likely be hearing quite a bit of in the coming months." Gerald Martinez from New Sunday Times declared it as a tune "well worth listening to", noting its "techno-pop".

Formats and track listings

 CD single
 "Breaking All the Rules" (LP Version) – 3:28
 "Breaking All the Rules" (Radio Mix) – 3:41
 "Breaking All the Rules" (Bass Rules Mix) – 3:30
 "Breaking All the Rules" (Berman Brothers Dance Mix) – 3:38
 "Breaking All the Rules"  (Soul Solution Radio Mix) – 3:19
 "Breaking All the Rules"  (Soul Solution Club Mix) – 7:17
 "Breaking All the Rules" (Soul Solution Dub Mix) – 5:48

 12" maxi
 "Breaking All the Rules"  (Soul Solution Club Mix) – 7:18
 "Breaking All the Rules" (Soul Solution Dub Mix) – 5:47
 "Breaking All the Rules" (Berman Brothers 12" Mix) – 5:55
 "Breaking All the Rules" (Bass Rules Mix) – 3:29

 CD maxi
 "Breaking All the Rules" (LP Version) – 3:28
 "Breaking All the Rules" (Radio Mix) – 3:41
 "Breaking All the Rules" (Bass Rules Mix) – 3:30
 "Breaking All the Rules" (Berman Brothers Dance Mix) – 3:38
 "Breaking All the Rules"  (Soul Solution Radio Mix) – 3:19
 "Breaking All the Rules"  (Soul Solution Club Mix) – 7:17
 "Breaking All the Rules" (Soul Solution Dub Mix) – 5:48

 CD maxi - Remixes
 "Breaking All the Rules" (Soul Solution Club Mix) – 7:18
 "Breaking All the Rules" (Soul Solution Dub Mix) – 5:47
 "Breaking All the Rules" (Berman Brothers 12" Mix) – 5:55
 "Breaking All the Rules" (Bass Rules Mix) – 3:30

Charts

References

External links
 

1997 debut singles
1997 songs
Dance-pop songs
Geffen Records singles